Enhanced CD is a certification mark of the Recording Industry Association of America for various technologies that combine  audio and computer data for use in both Compact Disc and CD-ROM  players.

Formats that fall under the "enhanced CD" category include mixed mode CD (Yellow Book CD-ROM/Red Book CD-DA), CD-i, CD-i Ready, and CD-Extra/CD-Plus (Blue Book, also called simply Enhanced Music CD or E-CD).

The technology was popular in the late 1990s and early 2000s with the increase of computer usage. Music CDs often included music videos, wallpapers, and other various content. However, more recently, acts wishing to include enhanced content often include a DVD instead, with the disadvantage of it not playing in a CD audio player, but with the advantage of storing greater amounts of data and/or higher-quality video.

Problems

Sometimes computer CD-ripping programs (particularly cdparanoia and CDBurnerXP) have problems ripping some enhanced CDs, especially those that have the data in a separate section after the audio section. These CDs have the data 11,400 sectors  (2m32s) after the audio, but some CD rippers may try to rip this blank  section with the last track; the end result is that the ripper stalls during the last track or simply reports errors.

Some more modern computers have difficulty reading the computer data off an Enhanced CD, and require separate software to detect it.

See also
DualDisc
CDVU+
Super Audio CD
Mixed Mode CD

References

120 mm discs
Audio storage
Certification marks
Video storage